Nadi Riadi Baladiate Touggourt, known as NRB Touggourt or simply NRBT for short, is an Algerian football club located in Touggourt, Algeria. The club was founded in 1936 and its colours areblack and white. Their home stadium, Stade El Moustakbel, has a capacity of 10,000 spectators. The club is currently playing in the Ligue Nationale du Football Amateur.

References

Football clubs in Algeria
Association football clubs established in 1936
1936 establishments in Algeria
Sports clubs in Algeria